Haplogroup O-M122 (also known as Haplogroup O2 (formerly Haplogroup O3)) is an Eastern Eurasian Y-chromosome haplogroup. The lineage ranges across Southeast Asia and East Asia, where it dominates the paternal lineages with extremely high frequencies. It is also significantly present in Central Asia, especially among the Naiman tribe of Kazakhs.

This lineage is a descendant haplogroup of haplogroup O-M175.

Origins
Researchers believe that O-M122 first appeared in Southeast Asia approximately 25,000-30,000 years ago  or roughly between 30,000 and 35,000 years ago according to more recent studies (Karmin et al. 2015, Poznik et al. 2016, YFull January 4, 2018). In a systematic sampling and genetic screening of an East Asian–specific Y-chromosome haplogroup (O-M122) in 2,332 individuals from diverse East Asian populations, results indicate that the O-M122 lineage is dominant in East Asian populations, with an average frequency of 44.3%. Microsatellite data show that the O-M122 haplotypes are more diverse in Southeast Asia than those in northern East Asia. This suggests a southern origin of the O-M122 mutation to be likely.

It was part of the settlement of East Asia. However, the prehistoric peopling of East Asia by modern humans remains controversial with respect to early population migrations and the place of the O-M122 lineage in these migrations is ambivalent.

Distribution
Although Haplogroup O-M122 appears to be primarily associated with Chinese people, it also forms a significant component of the Y-chromosome diversity of most modern populations of the East Asian region.

East Asia 
The distribution of Haplogroup O-M122 stretches far into Asia (approx. 40% of Dungans, 30% of Salars, 28% of Bonan, 24% of Dongxiang, 18% to 22.8% of Mongolian citizens in Ulaanbaatar, 11%-15.4% of Khalkha Mongolians (Yamamoto et al. 2013) but also as high as 31.1% (Kim et al. 2011), 12% of Uyghurs, 9% of Kazakhs  but in the Naiman of Kazakhs 65.81%, 6.8% of Kalmyks (17.1% of Khoshuud, 6.1% of Dörwöd, 3.3% of Torguud, 0% of Buzawa), 6.2% of Altaians, 5.3% of Kyrgyz, 4.1% of Uzbeks, and 4.0% of Buryats.

Modern northern Han Chinese Y haplogroups and mtdna match those of ancient northern Han Chinese ancestors 3,000 years ago from the Hengbei archeological site. 89 ancient samples were taken. Y haplogroups O3a, O3a3, M, O2a, Q1a1, and O* were all found in Hengbei samples. Three men who lived in the Neolithic era are the ancestors of 40% of Han Chinese, with their Y haplogroups being subclades of O3a-M324 and they are estimated to have lived 6,800 years ago,  6,500 years ago and 5,400 years ago.

The East Asian O3-M122 Y chromosome Haplogroup is found in large quantities in other Muslims close to the Hui people like Dongxiang, Bo'an and Salar. The majority of Tibeto-Burmans, Han Chinese, and Ningxia and Liaoning Hui share paternal Y chromosomes of East Asian origin which are unrelated to Middle Easterners and Europeans. In contrast to distant Middle Eastern and Europeans whom the Muslims of China are not related to, East Asians, Han Chinese, and most of the Hui and Dongxiang of Linxia share more genes with each other. This indicates that native East Asian populations converted to Islam and were culturally assimilated to these ethnicities and that Chinese Muslim populations are mostly not descendants of foreigners as claimed by some accounts while only a small minority of them are.

South Asia 
Haplogroup O-M122 is restricted among tribal groups of Northeast India where it is found at very high frequencies. In Arunachal Pradesh, it is found at 89% among Adi, 82% among Apatani, and 94% among Nishi, while the Naga people show it at 100%. In Meghalaya, 59.2% (42/71) of a sample of Garos and 31.7% (112/353) of a sample of Khasis have been found to belong to O-M122. In Nepal, Tamang people present a very high frequency of O-M122 (39/45 = 86.7%), while much lower percentages of Newar (14/66 = 21.2%) and the general population of Kathmandu (16/77 = 20.8%) belong to this haplogroup. A study published in 2009 found O-M122 in 52.6% (30/57, including 28 members of O-M117 and two members of O-M134(xM117)) of a sample of Tharus from a village in Chitwan District of south-central Nepal, 28.6% (22/77, all O-M117) of a sample of Tharus from another village in Chitwan District, and 18.9% (7/37, all O-M117) of a sample of Tharus from a village in Morang District of southeastern Nepal. In contrast, the same study found O-M122 in only one individual in a sample of non-Tharu Hindus collected in Chitwan District (1/26 = 3.8% O-M134(xM117)), one tribal individual from Andhra Pradesh, India (1/29 = 3.4% O-M117), and one individual in a sample of Hindus from New Delhi, India (1/49 = 2.0% O-M122(xM134)).

Southeast Asia 
Among all the populations of East and Southeast Asia, Haplogroup O-M122 is most closely associated with those that speak a Sinitic, Tibeto-Burman, or Hmong–Mien language. Haplogroup O-M122 comprises about 50% or more of the total Y-chromosome variation among the populations of each of these language families. The Sinitic and Tibeto-Burman language families are generally believed to be derived from a common Sino-Tibetan protolanguage, and most linguists place the homeland of the Sino-Tibetan language family somewhere in northern China. The Hmong–Mien languages and cultures, for various archaeological and ethnohistorical reasons, are also generally believed to have derived from a source somewhere north of their current distribution, perhaps in northern or central China. The Tibetans, however, despite the fact that they speak a language of the Tibeto-Burman language family, have high percentages of the otherwise rare haplogroups D-M15 and D3, which are also found at much lower frequencies among the members of some other ethnic groups in East Asia and Central Asia.

Haplogroup O-M122 has been implicated as a diagnostic genetic marker of the Austronesian expansion when it is found in populations of insular Southeast Asia and Oceania.  It appears at moderately high frequencies in the Philippines, Malaysia, and Indonesia. Its distribution in Oceania is mostly limited to the traditionally Austronesian culture zones, chiefly Polynesia (approx. 25%  to 32.5% ).  O-M122 is found at generally lower frequencies in coastal and island Melanesia, Micronesia, and Taiwanese aboriginal tribes (18%  to 27.4%  of Micronesians, and 5% of Melanesians, albeit with reduced frequencies of most subclades.

Haplogroup O-M122* Y-chromosomes, which are not defined by any identified downstream markers, are actually more common among certain non-Han Chinese populations than among Han Chinese ones, and the presence of these O-M122* Y-chromosomes among various populations of Central Asia, East Asia, and Oceania is more likely to reflect a very ancient shared ancestry of these populations rather than the result of any historical events. It remains to be seen whether Haplogroup O-M122* Y-chromosomes can be parsed into distinct subclades that display significant geographical or ethnic correlations.

Subclade Distribution

Paragroup O-M122* 
Paragroup O2*-M122(xO2a-P197) Y-DNA is quite rare, having been detected only in 2/165 = 1.2% of a sample of Han Chinese in a pool of samples from mainland China, Taiwan, the Philippines, Vietnam, and Malaysia (n=581), 8/641 = 1.2% of a sample of Balinese in a pool of samples from western Indonesia (n=960), and 7/350 = 2.0% of a sample of males from Sumba in a pool of samples from eastern Indonesia (n=957). In the same study, O2*-M122(xO2a-P197) Y-DNA was not observed in a pool of samples from Oceania (n=182).

A paper published by a group of mainly Chinese geneticists in the American Journal of Human Genetics in 2005 reported the detection of O2*-M122(xO2a-M324) Y-DNA in 1.6% (8/488) of a pool of seven samples of Han Chinese (3/64 = 4.7% Sichuan, 2/98 = 2.0% Zibo, Shandong, 1/60 = 1.7% Inner Mongolia, 1/81 = 1.2% Yunnan, 1/86 = 1.2% Laizhou, Shandong, 0/39 Guangxi, 0/60 Gansu). O2*-M122(xO2a-M324) Y-DNA also was detected in the following samples of ethnic minorities in China: 5.9% (1/17) Jingpo from Yunnan, 4.3% (2/47) Zhuang from Yunnan, 4.1% (2/49) Lisu from Yunnan, 3.2% (1/31) Wa from Yunnan, 2.6% (1/39) Zhuang from Guangxi, 2.5% (2/80) Bai from Yunnan, 2.4% (1/41) Hani from Yunnan, 2.3% (2/88) Lahu from Yunnan, 2.1% (1/47) Yi from Yunnan, 2.1% (1/48) Miao from Yunnan, 1.5% (2/132) Dai from Yunnan, 1.0% (1/105) Miao from Hunan, and 0.9% (2/225) Yao from Guangxi.

O2*-M122(xO2a-M324) Y-DNA has been found as a singleton (1/156 = 0.6%) in a sample from Tibet. It also has been found as a singleton in a sample of nineteen members of the Chin people in Chin State, Myanmar.

In a paper published in 2011, Korean researchers have reported finding O2*-M122(xO2a-M324) Y-DNA in the following samples: 5.9% (3/51) Beijing Han, 3.1% (2/64) Filipino, 2.1% (1/48) Vietnamese, 1.7% (1/60) Yunnan Han, 0.4% (2/506) Korean, including 1/87 from Jeju and 1/110 from Seoul-Gyeonggi. In another study published in 2012, Korean researchers have found O-M122(xM324) Y-DNA in 0.35% (2/573) of a sample from Seoul; however, no individual belonging to O-M122(xM324) was observed in a sample of 133 individuals from Daejeon.

In 2011, Chinese researchers published a paper reporting their finding of O2*-M122(xO2a-M324) Y-DNA in 3.0% (5/167) of a sample of Han Chinese with origins in East China (defined as consisting of Jiangsu, Zhejiang, Shanghai, and Anhui) and in 1.5% (1/65) of a sample of Han Chinese with origins in Southern China. O2* Y-DNA was not detected in their sample of Han Chinese with origins in Northern China (n=129).

In a paper published in 2012, O2*-M122(xO2a-P200) Y-DNA was found in 12% (3/25) of a sample of Lao males from Luang Prabang, Laos. O2* Y-DNA was not detected in this study's samples of Cham from Binh Thuan, Vietnam (n=59), Kinh from Hanoi, Vietnam (n=76), or Thai from northern Thailand (n=17).

Trejaut et al. (2014) found O2-M122(xO2a-M324) in 6/40 (15.0%) Siraya in Kaohsiung, 1/17 (5.9%) Sulawesi, 1/25 (4.0%) Paiwan, 2/55 (3.6%) Fujian Han, 1/30 (3.3%) Ketagalan, 2/60 (3.3%) Taiwan Minnan, 1/34 (2.9%) Taiwan Hakka, 1/38 (2.6%) Siraya in Hwalien, 5/258 (1.9%) miscellaneous Han volunteers in Taiwan, and 1/75 (1.3%) in a sample of the general population of Thailand.

Brunelli et al. (2017) found O2-M122(xO2a-M324) in 5/66 (7.6%) Tai Yuan, 1/91 (1.1%) Tai Lue, and 1/205 (0.5%) Khon Mueang in samples of the people of Northern Thailand.

O-M324

O-M121 
O2a1a1a1a1-M121 is a subclade of O2a1-L127.1, parallel to O2a1b-M164 and O2a1c-JST002611.

In an early survey of Y-DNA variation in present-day human populations of the world, O-M121 was detected only in 5.6% (1/18) of a sample from Cambodia and Laos and in 5.0% (1/20) of a sample from China.

In a large study of 2,332 unrelated male samples collected from 40 populations in East Asia (and especially Southwest China), O-M121/DYS257 Y-DNA was detected only in 7.1% (1/14) of a sample of Cambodians and in 1.0% (1/98) of a sample of Han Chinese from Zibo, Shandong.

In a study published in 2011, O-M121 Y-DNA was found in 1.2% (2/167) of a sample of Han Chinese with origins in East China, defined as consisting of Jiangsu, Anhui, Zhejiang, and Shanghai, and in 0.8% (1/129) of a sample of Han Chinese with origins in Northern China. O-M121 was not detected in this study's sample of Han Chinese with origins in Southern China (n=65).

O-L599 (considered to be phylogenetically equivalent to O-M121) also has been found in one individual in the 1000 Genomes Project sample of Han Chinese from Hunan, China (n=37), one individual in the 1000 Genomes Project sample of Kinh from Ho Chi Minh City, Vietnam, one individual in the Human Genome Diversity Project sample of Tujia, an individual from Singapore, and an individual from the Jakarta metropolitan area. According to 23mofang, O-L599 currently accounts for about 0.79% of the male population in China and is concentrated in Fujian, Taiwan, Jiangxi, Anhui, Hubei, Zhejiang and other provinces and cities; it appears to have undergone explosive population growth between about 2600 and 2300 years ago.

O-M164 
O2a1b-M164 is a subclade of O2a1-L127.1, parallel to O2a1a1a1a1-M121 and O2a1c-JST002611.
 
In an early survey of Y-DNA variation in present-day human populations of the world, O-M164 was detected only in 5.6% (1/18) of a sample from Cambodia and Laos.

In a large study of 2,332 unrelated male samples collected from 40 populations in East Asia (and especially Southwest China), O2a1b-M164 Y-DNA was detected only in 7.1% (1/14) of a sample of Cambodians.

According to 23mofang, O-M164 is a recent branch (TMRCA 2120 years) downstream of O2a1c-JST002611 rather than parallel to it. Out of fourteen members total, six are from Guangdong, five are from Fujian, one is from Nantong, one is from Wenzhou, and one is from Taiwan.

O-JST002611 
Haplogroup O2a1c-JST002611 is derived from O2-M122 via O2a-M324/P93/P197/P199/P200 and O2a1-L127.1/L465/L467. O2a1c-JST002611 is the most commonly observed type of O2a1 Y-DNA, and, more generally, represents the majority of extant O2-M122 Y-DNA that does not belong to the expansive subclade O2a2-P201.
 
Haplogroup O2a1c-JST002611 was first identified in 3.8% (10/263) of a sample of Japanese (Nonaka et al. 2007). It also has been found in 3.5% (2/57) of the JPT (Japanese in Tokyo, Japan) sample of the 1000 Genomes Project, including one member of the rare and deeply divergent paragroup O2a1c1-F18*(xO2a1c1a1-F117, O2a1c1a2-F449). Subsequently, this haplogroup has been found with higher frequency in some samples taken in and around China, including 12/58 = 20.7% Miao (China), 10/70 = 14.3% Vietnam, 18/165 = 10.9% Han (China & Taiwan), 4/49 = 8.2% Tujia (China). O-002611 also has been found in a singleton from the Philippines (1/48 = 2.1%), but it has not been detected in samples from Malaysia (0/32), Taiwanese Aboriginals (0/48), She from China (0/51), Yao from China (0/60), Oceania (0/182), eastern Indonesia (0/957), or western Indonesia (0/960). Haplogroup O2a1c‐JST002611 is prevalent in different
ethnic groups in China and Southeast Asia, including Vietnam (14.29%), Sichuan of southwestern China (Han, 14.60%; Tibetan in Xinlong County, 15.22%), Jilin of northeastern China (Korean, 9.36%), Inner Mongolia (Mongolian, 6.58%), and Gansu of northwestern China (Baima, 7.35%; Han, 11.30%). Y-DNA belonging to haplogroup O-JST002611 has been observed in 10.6% (61/573) of a sample collected in Seoul and 8.3% (11/133) of a sample collected in Daejeon, South Korea.

According to 23mofang, haplogroup O-IMS-JST002611 currently accounts for approximately 14.69% of the entire male population of China, and its TMRCA is estimated to be 12,770 years.

O-P201 
O2a2-JST021354/P201 is a subclade of O2a that includes the most common types of O2-M122 Y-DNA. This clade includes the major subclades O2a2b1-M134 (subclade of O-P164) and O2a2a1a2-M7, which exhibit expansive distributions centered on China, as well as an assortment of Y-chromosomes that have not yet been assigned to any subclade.

O2a2-P201(xO2a2a1a2-M7, O2a2b1-M134) Y-DNA has been detected with high frequency in many samples of Austronesian-speaking populations, in particular some samples of Batak Toba from Sumatra (21/38 = 55.3%), Tongans (5/12 = 41.7%), and Filipinos (12/48 = 25.0%).  Outside of Austronesia, O2a2-P201(xO2a2a1a2-M7, O2a2b1-M134) Y-DNA has been observed in samples of Tujia (7/49 = 14.3%), Han Chinese (14/165 = 8.5%), Japanese (11/263 = 4.2%), Miao (1/58 = 1.7%), and Vietnam (1/70 = 1.4%) ( and ).

O-M159 
O2a2a1a1a-M159 is a subclade of O2a2-P201. In an early survey of Y-DNA variation in present-day human populations of the world, O-M159 was detected only in 5.0% (1/20) of a sample from China.

Unlike its phylogenetic siblings, O-M7 and O-M134, O-M159 is very rare, having been found only in 2.9% (1/35) of a sample of Han males from Meixian, Guangdong in a study of 988 males from East Asia.

In a study published in 2011, O-M159 was detected in 1.5% (1/65) of a sample of Han Chinese with origins in Southern China. O-M159 was not detected in the same study's samples of Han Chinese with origins in East China (n=167) or Northern China (n=129).

Trejaut et al. (2014) found O-M159 in 5.0% (3/60) Minnan in Taiwan, 4.2% (1/24) Hanoi, Vietnam, 3.88% (10/258) miscellaneous Han volunteers in Taiwan, 3.6% (2/55) Han in Fujian, 3.24% (12/370) Plains Aborigines in Taiwan (mostly assimilated to Han Chinese), 1.04% (2/192) Western Indonesia (1/25 Kalimantan, 1/26 Sumatra), and 0.68% (1/146) Philippines (1/55 South Luzon).

Kutanan et al. (2019) found O-M159 in 1.6% (2/129) of their samples of Thai people from Central Thailand.

According to 23mofang, the TMRCA of haplogroup O-M159 is estimated to be 8,020 years. It is currently distributed mainly in southern China, accounting for about 0.78% of the total male population of China.

O-M7 

Haplogroup O2a2a1a2-M7 Y-DNA has been detected with high frequency in some samples of populations who speak Hmong-Mien languages, Katuic languages, or Bahnaric languages, scattered through some mostly mountainous areas of southern China, Laos, and Vietnam.

O-M7 has been noted for having a widespread but uneven distribution among populations that speak Hmong-Mien languages, such as She (29/51 = 56.9% She, 10/34 = 29.4% She, 14/56 = 25.0% Northern She from Zhejiang), Miao (21/58 = 36.2% Miao from China, 17/51 = 33.3% Hmong Daw from northern Laos, 6/49 = 12.2% Yunnan Miao, 2/49 = 4.1% Guizhou Miao, 4/100 = 4.0% Hunan Miao), and Yao (18/35 = 51.4% Yao from Liannan, Guangdong, 29/60 = 48.3% Yao from Guangxi, 12/35 = 34.3% Yao from Bama, Guangxi, 12/37 = 32.4% Zaomin from Guangdong, 5/36 = 13.9% Bunu from Guangxi, 1/11 = 9.1% Top-Board Mien, 3/41 = 7.3% Native Mien, 2/31 = 6.5% Southern Mien from Guangxi, 1/19 = 5.3% Flowery-Headed Mien from Guangxi, 1/20 = 5.0% Mountain Straggler Mien from Hunan, 1/28 = 3.6% Blue Kimmun from Guangxi, 1/31 = 3.2% Pahng from Guangxi, 1/47 = 2.1% Western Mien from Yunnan, 0/11 Thin Board Mien, 0/31 Lowland Yao from Guangxi, 0/32 Mountain Kimmun from Yunnan, 0/33 Northern Mien, and 0/41 Lowland Kimmun from Guangxi). 

Cai et al. 2010 have reported finding high frequencies of O-M7 in their samples of Katuic (17/35 = 48.6% Ngeq, 10/45 = 22.2% Katu, 6/37 = 16.2% Kataang, 3/34 = 8.8% Inh (Ir), 4/50 = 8.0% So, 1/39 = 2.6% Suy) and Bahnaric (15/32 = 46.9% Jeh, 17/50 = 34.0% Oy, 8/32 = 25.0% Brau, 8/35 = 22.9% Talieng, 4/30 = 13.3% Alak, 6/50 = 12.0% Laven) peoples from southern Laos. However, O-M7 has been found only with low frequency in samples of linguistically related Khmuic populations from northern Laos (1/50 = 2.0% Mal, 1/51 = 2.0% Khmu, 0/28 Bit, 0/29 Xinhmul), Vietic peoples from Vietnam and central Laos (8/76 = 10.5% Kinh from Hanoi, Vietnam, 4/50 = 8.0% Kinh from northern Vietnam, 2/28 = 7.1% Bo, 4/70 = 5.7% Vietnamese, 0/12 Muong, 0/15 Kinh, 0/38 Aheu), Palaungic peoples from northwestern Laos and southwestern Yunnan (2/35 = 5.7% Lamet, 0/29 Ava, 0/52 Blang), and Pakanic peoples from southeastern Yunnan and northwestern Guangxi (0/30 Palyu, 0/32 Bugan).

Haplogroup O-M7 has been found with notable frequency in some samples of Austronesian populations from the central part of the Malay Archipelago (17/86 = 19.8% Indonesians from Borneo, 4/32 = 12.5% Malaysia, 7/61 = 11.5% Java (mostly sampled in Dieng), 6/56 = 10.7% Sumatra, 4/53 = 7.5% Java, 1/17 = 5.9% Malaysia), but the frequency of this haplogroup appears to drop off very quickly toward the east (1/48 = 2.1% Philippines, 5/641 = 0.8% Balinese, 0/9 Timor, 0/28 Alor, 0/30 Moluccas, 0/31 Nusa Tenggaras, 0/33 Moluccas, 0/37 Philippines, 0/40 Borneo, 0/48 Taiwanese Aboriginals, 0/54 Mandar from Sulawesi, 0/92 Lembata, 0/350 Sumba, 0/394 Flores) and toward the west (0/38 Batak Toba from Sumatra, 0/60 Nias, 0/74 Mentawai).  O-M7 has been found in 14.8% (4/27) of a sample of Giarai from southern Vietnam, 8.3% (2/24) of a sample of Ede from southern Vietnam, and 5.1% (3/59) of a sample of Cham from Binh Thuan, Vietnam. These Chamic-speaking peoples inhabit southern Vietnam and eastern Cambodia, but their languages are related to those of the Acehnese and Malays. O-M7 also has been found in 21.1% (8/38) of a small set of samples of highlanders of northern Luzon (including 1/1 Ifugao, 1/2 Ibaloi, 4/12 Kalangoya, and 2/6 Kankanaey).

In the northern fringes of its distribution, O-M7 has been found in samples of Oroqen (2/31 = 6.5%), Tujia from Hunan (3/49 = 6.1%), Qiang (2/33 = 6.1%), Han Chinese (2/32 = 6.3% Han from Yili, Xinjiang, 4/66 = 6.1% Han from Huize, Yunnan, 2/35 = 5.7% Han from Meixian, Guangdong, 1/18 = 5.6% Han from Wuhan, Hubei, 6/148 = 4.1% Han from Changting, Fujian, 20/530 = 3.8% Han Chinese from Chongming Island, 2/63 = 3.2% Han from Weicheng, Sichuan, 18/689 = 2.6% Han Chinese from Pudong, 2/100 = 2.0% Han from Nanjing, Jiangsu, 3/165 = 1.8% Han Chinese, 1/55 = 1.8% Han from Shanghai), Manchus (1/50 = 2.0% Manchu from Liaoning), and Koreans (2/133 = 1.5% Daejeon, 1/300 = 0.3% unrelated Korean males obtained from the National Biobank of Korea, 1/573 = 0.2% Seoul).

According to 23mofang, O-M7 has a TMRCA of approximately 13,700 years and is currently relatively common among many ethnic groups in Sichuan and Yunnan, as well as among the Zhuang, Austroasiatic, and Austronesian groups. O-M7 now accounts for about 2.19% of the total male population in China.

O-M134

O-M134* 
Paragroup O-M134(xM117) has been found with very high frequency in some samples of Kim Mun people, a subgroup of the Yao people of southern China (16/32 = 50.0% Mountain Kimmun from southern Yunnan, 11/28 = 39.3% Blue Kimmun from western Guangxi). However, this paragroup has been detected in only 3/41 = 7.3% of a sample of Lowland Kimmun from eastern Guangxi. This paragroup also has been found with high frequency in some Kazakh samples, especially the Naiman tribe (102/155 = 65.81%)( and ) Dulik hypothesizes that O-M134 in Kazakhs was due to a later expansion due to its much more recent TMRCA time.

The general outline of the distribution of O-M134(xM117) among modern populations is different as that of the related clade O-M117. In particular, O-M134(xM117) occurs with only low frequency or is nonexistent among most Tibeto-Burman-speaking populations of Southwest China, Northeast India, and Nepal, who exhibit extremely high frequencies of O-M117. This paragroup also occurs with very low frequency or is non-existent among most Mon-Khmer population of Laos, who exhibit much higher frequencies of O-M117. In Han Chinese, the paragroup is found in approximately the same percentage as O-M117, but has a higher distribution in northern Han Chinese than Southern Han Chinese.

According to 23mofang, the TMRCA of O-M134 is estimated to be 17,900 years, and O-M134(xM117) can be divided into two subsets: O-F122 (TMRCA 17,380 years), which is subsumed alongside O-M117 in an O-F450 clade (TMRCA 17,800 years), and O-MF59333 (TMRCA 13,130 years, currently distributed mainly in southern China and accounting for the Y-DNA of approximately 0.06% of the total male population of China), which is derived from O-M134 but basal to O-F450. O-F122 in turn is divided into O-MF38 (TMRCA 4,560 years, currently distributed mainly in northern China and accounting for the Y-DNA of approximately 0.03% of the total male population of China) and O-F114 (TMRCA 15,310 years, accounts for the Y-DNA of approximately 11.39% of the total male population of China). The O-F46 (TMRCA 9,190 years) subclade of O-F114 by itself accounts for the Y-DNA of approximately 10.17% of the total male population of present-day China.

In a study of Koreans from Seoul (n=573) and Daejeon (n=133), haplogroup O-M134(xM117), all members of which have been found to belong to O-F444 (phylogenetically equivalent to O-F114), has been found in 9.42% of the sample from Seoul and 10.53% of the sample from Daejeon.

In a study of Japanese (n=263), haplogroup O-M134(xM117) has been observed in nine individuals, or 3.4% of the entire sample set. The Japanese members of O-M134(xM117) in this study have originated from Shizuoka (3/12 = 25%), Tokyo (2/52 = 3.8%), Toyama (1/3), Ishikawa (1/4), Tochigi (1/5), and Ibaraki (1/5), respectively.

O-M117 
Haplogroup O2a2b1a1-M117 (also defined by the phylogenetically equivalent mutation Page23) is a subclade of O2a2b1-M134 that occurs frequently in China and in neighboring countries, especially among Tibeto-Burman-speaking peoples.

O-M117 has been detected in samples of Tamang (38/45 = 84.4%)，Tibetans (45/156 = 28.8% or 13/35 = 37.1%), Tharus (57/171 = 33.3%), Han Taiwanese (40/183 = 21.9%), Newars (14/66 = 21.2%), the general population of Kathmandu, Nepal (13/77 = 16.9%), Han Chinese (5/34 = 14.7% Chengdu, 5/35 = 14.3% Harbin, 4/35 = 11.4% Meixian, 3/30 = 10.0% Lanzhou, 2/32 = 6.3% Yili), Tungusic peoples from the PRC (7/45 = 15.6% Hezhe, 4/26 = 15.4% Ewenki, 5/35 = 14.3% Manchu, 2/41 = 4.9% Xibe, 1/31 = 3.2% Oroqen), Koreans (4/25 = 16.0% Koreans from the PRC, 5/43 = 11.6% Koreans from South Korea), Mongols (5/45 = 11.1% Inner Mongolian, 3/39 = 7.7% Daur, 3/65 = 4.6% Outer Mongolian), and Uyghurs (2/39 = 5.1% Yili, 1/31 = 3.2% Urumqi) (and ).

Like O-M7, O-M117 has been found with greatly varying frequency in many samples of Hmong-Mien-speaking peoples, such as Mienic peoples (7/20 = 35.0% Mountain Straggler Mien, 9/28 = 32.1% Blue Kimmun, 6/19 = 31.6% Flower Head Mien, 3/11 = 27.3% Top Board Mien, 3/11 = 27.3% Thin Board Mien, 11/47 = 23.4% Western Mien, 6/33 = 18.2% Northern Mien, 5/31 = 16.1% Lowland Yao, 5/35 = 14.3% Yao from Liannan, Guangdong, 5/37 = 13.5% Zaomin, 5/41 = 12.2% Lowland Kimmun, 3/41 = 7.3% Native Mien, 2/31 = 6.5% Southern Mien, 2/32 = 6.3% Mountain Kimmun, but 0/35 Yao from Bama, Guangxi), She (6/34 = 17.6% She, 4/56 = 7.1% Northern She), and Hmongic peoples (9/100 = 9.0% Miao from Hunan, 4/51 = 7.8% Hmong Daw from northern Laos, 3/49 = 6.1% Miao from Yunnan, 1/49 = 2.0% Miao from Guizhou, but 0/36 Bunu from Guangxi) ( and ).

In a study published by Chinese researchers in the year 2006, O-M117 has been found with high frequency (8/47 = 17.0%) in a sample of Japanese that should be from Kagawa Prefecture according to the geographical coordinates (134.0°E, 34.2°N) that have been provided. However, in a study published by Japanese researchers in the year 2007, the same haplogroup has been found with much lower frequency (11/263 = 4.2%) in a larger sample of Japanese from various regions of Japan. More precisely, the Japanese members of O-M117 in this study's sample set have originated from Tokyo (4/52), Chiba (2/44), Gifu (1/2), Yamanashi (1/2), Hiroshima (1/3), Aichi (1/6), and Shizuoka (1/12).

In Meghalaya, a predominantly tribal state of Northeast India, O-M133 has been found in 19.7% (14/71) of a sample of the Tibeto-Burman-speaking Garos, but in only 6.2% (22/353, ranging from 0/32 Bhoi to 6/44 = 13.6% Pnar) of a pool of eight samples of the neighboring Khasian-speaking tribes.

O-M300

O-M333

Phylogenetics

Phylogenetic History

Prior to 2002, there were in academic literature at least seven naming systems for the Y-Chromosome Phylogenetic tree. This led to considerable confusion. In 2002, the major research groups came together and formed the Y-Chromosome Consortium (YCC). They published a joint paper that created a single new tree that all agreed to use. Later, a group of citizen scientists with an interest in population genetics and genetic genealogy formed a working group to create an amateur tree aiming at being above all timely. The table below brings together all of these works at the point of the landmark 2002 YCC Tree. This allows a researcher reviewing older published literature to quickly move between nomenclatures.

Original Research Publications
The following research teams per their publications were represented in the creation of the YCC Tree.

Phylogenetic Trees
This phylogenetic tree of haplogroup O subclades is based on the YCC 2008 tree  and subsequent published research.
O-M122 (M122, P198)
O-P93 (M324, P93, P197, P198, P199, P200)
O-M121 (M121, P27.2)
O-M164 (M164)
O-P201 (P201/021354)
O-002611 (002611)
O-M300 (M300)
O-M333 (M333)

See also

Genetics

Y-DNA O Subclades

Y-DNA Backbone Tree

References

Citations

Sources 
 Journal articles 

 Websites

Sources for conversion tables
÷

Further reading

External links
Spread of Haplogroup O-M122, from The Genographic Project, National Geographic
China DNA interest group at Facebook
China DNA Project Website at Family Tree DNA

O-M122